Hesket (also Hesket-in-the-Forest) is a large civil parish in the Eden District of Cumbria, England, on the main A6 between Carlisle and Penrith. At the 2001 census it had a population of 2,363, increasing to 2,588 at the 2011 census, and estimated at 2,774 in 2019. The parish formed in 1894 with the passing of the Local Government Act 1894 and was enlarged to incorporate the parish of Plumpton Wall following a County Review Order in 1934. Hesket is part of the historic royal hunting ground of Inglewood Forest. Settlement in the parish dates back to the Roman occupation.

Extent
The parish is located between the city of Carlisle and the market town of Penrith, along nine miles of the A6. The parish encompasses the villages of Armathwaite, Calthwaite, High Hesket, Low Hesket, Plumpton and Southwaite, as well as the hamlets of Aiketgate, Morton, Old Town, Thiefside, Petteril Green and Plumpton Foot. It also includes parts of the villages of Ivegill and Wreay, with these villages also part of the parishes of Skelton and St Cuthbert Without respectively.

History
At Castlesteads or Old Penrith just north of Plumpton village are the remains of a Roman Fort known as Voreda. Just north of the site, aerial evidence has located two Roman camps, with limited excavation work in 1977 revealing pottery dating from AD 120. The structures are located near to the main Roman Road connecting the Vale of York to Carlilse, which now forms part of the modern-day A6.

Many of the villages in the parish have names with Norse origins, several with the common suffix of 'thwaite', from the Norse clearing or meadow. The name Hesket itself derives from the old Norse for horse ('hestr') and road or race course ('skeid'). In 1822, a viking cairn was discovered in the parish, along the route of the A6, near the modern location of Court Thorn GP Surgery, during operations to widen the road. The objects uncovered were placed in the collection at Tuille House Museum in Carlisle.

The parish is part of the Royal hunting ground known as Inglewood Forest, established by William the Conqueror and extended by Henry II.

In 1885, Police Constable Joseph Byrnes was shot and killed by three assailants in Plumpton. The trio were wanted in connection with a burglary at Netherby Hall. The men were later caught and sentenced to death by hanging. A memorial to Constable Byrnes was erected in the village and is now Grade II listed.

The civil parishes of Hesket-in-the-Forest and Plumpton Wall were formed under the Local Government Act 1894. Plumpton Wall was incorporated into Hesket-in-the-Forest in 1934, following a County Review Order.

Governance
Hesket is in the United Kingdom parliamentary constituency of Penrith and the Border. Neil Hudson was elected its Conservative Member of Parliament at the 2019 General Election, replacing fellow Conservative Rory Stewart, who announced his intention to stand down from both parliament and the party in October 2019.

A district ward named Hesket exists, which incorporates the Parishes of Hesket and Catterlen, electing two representatives to Eden District Council. The ward is currently represented by Conservative Councilor Elaine Martin and Independent Group Councillor David Ryland, both elected in May 2019. At county level, the parish falls within the Greystoke and Hesket ward, electing one councillor to Cumbria County Council. In 2017, the seat was won by the Conservative Tom Wentworth-Waites. In March 2022, it was confirmed that Cumbria would be restructured into two unitary authorities, abolishing the County Council and all six District Councils. Hesket will fall within the new unitary authority of Westmorland and Furness. Elections for a shadow authority took place in May 2022, with the authority due to take over governance in April 2023.

Hesket Parish Council divides into three electoral wards, Armathwaite, Calthwaite and Southwaite, each electing five Parish Councillors.

Transport
The Settle-Carlisle Railway, which opened in 1876, runs through the parish with a station at Armathwaite. Next to it is a Victorian signal box maintained by local volunteers and open for viewing. The West Coast Main Line also runs through the parish. At one time there were stations on the line at Plumpton, which closed in 1948, and Southwaite and Calthwaite, both of which closed in 1952.

The M6 motorway and the A6 road run parallel to each other through the parish with a motorway service area at Southwaite. The 104 bus service also runs through the villages of Plumpton, Low Hesket and High Hesket, operated by Stagecoach between Carlisle and Penrith. There is a community bus service, Fellrunner, which provides return journeys to Carlisle and Penrith from various stops in the parish. The service was established in 1979, spearheaded by a local clergyman, the Reverend Phillip Canham, and is run entirely by volunteers.

Amenities
The parish has five primary schools, in the villages of Armathwaite, Calthwaite, High Hesket, Ivegill and Plumpton. There are three village halls, in the villages of Low Hesket, Ivegill and Armathwaite, run by volunteers, and a community centre housed in a former Methodist chapel between the villages of Calthwaite and Plumpton. The villages of Armathwaite, Calthwaite, High Hesket, Ivegill and Plumpton all have parish churches.

Armathwaite village has a village shop and post office, two public houses and a children's play area. Calthwaite has a public house, a children's play area and a youth football club. Low Hesket also has a public house. The primary school playground in Plumpton doubles as a children's play area out of school hours. The village has a garden centre and cafe at the former station yard.

Places of interest
The parish contains sixty-six listed buildings, including three Grade II* listed: Armathwaite Castle, now a private residence, the Church of St Mary's in High Hesket, dating from the 18th century but incorporating parts of the medieval church building, and the 16th-century Southwaite Hall Copper House and barns. It also contains the Grade II listed Katharine Well at Mellguards, just outside the village of Southwaite, built as a memorial to the sister of the local architect and philanthropist Sara Losh.

Gallery

External links

 Cumbria County History Trust: Hesket in the Forest

Notes

References

Civil parishes in Cumbria
Inglewood Forest
Eden District